During the 1999–2000 English football season, Southampton Football Club competed in the FA Premier League.

Season summary
Manager Dave Jones was given leave from his duties in January to concentrate on clearing his name in connection with child abuse charges, and former England boss Glenn Hoddle was appointed on a temporary basis. Hoddle did well to keep the Saints clear of relegation, and safety was achieved with a 15th-place finish and a respectable 44 points. As the new season approached, it was still unclear as to whether Jones would ever return to the club.

Matt Le Tissier scored a modest six goals during the season, but that was sufficient to bring his total number of Premier League goals to 100, making him the first midfielder to reach this milestone. Le Tissier reached the milestone in Southampton's 2–1 defeat to Sunderland on 1 April 2000 with a goal from the penalty spot.

Final league table

Results summary

Results by round

Results
Southampton's score comes first

Legend

FA Premier League

FA Cup

League Cup

First-team squad
Squad at end of season

Left club during season

Reserve squad

References

Southampton F.C. seasons
Southampton